Rick Danko in Concert was Band bassist and singer Rick Danko's second solo release, issued in 1997 as the first release from Woodstock Records, a small label in which Danko and the Band had interests. Featuring live recordings of eight tracks previously issued on both early-period and late-period Band albums (with a cover of "Don't Mess Up a Good Thing" added to give keyboardist Aaron Hurwitz a vocal shot), it was culled from two low-fidelity live shows at the Orpheum Theatre, Boston, Massachusetts, on 22 February 1997, and Atomic Productions, Clinton, New Jersey, on 6 March 1997.

The album features stripped-down arrangements, as only Danko (mostly sticking to guitar), Aaron Hurwitz (piano and accordion) and Band drummer Randy Ciarlante are present.

Track listing
 "Intro" – 0:13
 "Crazy Mama" (J. J. Cale) – 5:25
 "Twilight" (Robbie Robertson, Rick Danko) – 4:39
 "Stage Fright" (Robertson) – 4:14
 "It Makes No Difference" (Robertson) – 5:31
 "Long Black Veil" (M. J. Wilkin, Danny Dill) – 6:41
 "Don't Mess Up a Good Thing" (Oliver Sain) – 3:55
 "Blind Willie McTell" (Bob Dylan) – 5:40
 "Chest Fever" (Robertson) – 5:58
 "The Shape I'm In" (Robertson) – 4:44

Personnel
 Rick Danko – guitar, bass, lead and backing vocals
 Aaron Hurwitz – piano, accordion, backing and lead vocals
 Randy Ciarlante – drums, backing and lead vocals

Rick Danko albums
1997 live albums